Edward More may refer to:

Edward More (churchman) (1479–1541), English churchman and educator
Edward More (poet) (c. 1537–1620), English poet and grandson of Thomas More 
Edward More (MP) (c. 1555–1623), MP for Hampshire and Midhurst

See also
Edward Moore (disambiguation)